Stathis Lamprou (born 20 September 1998) is a Greek professional footballer who plays as a defensive midfielder.

References

1998 births
Living people
Greek footballers
Greece under-21 international footballers
Greece youth international footballers
Super League Greece players
Football League (Greece) players
Olympiacos F.C. players
Aittitos Spata F.C. players
Egaleo F.C. players
Association football midfielders
Footballers from Chalcis